Choi Jong-ok (born 15 August 1945) is a South Korean former volleyball player who competed in the 1972 Summer Olympics.

References

1945 births
Living people
South Korean men's volleyball players
Olympic volleyball players of South Korea
Volleyball players at the 1972 Summer Olympics
Asian Games medalists in volleyball
Volleyball players at the 1966 Asian Games
Medalists at the 1966 Asian Games
Asian Games silver medalists for South Korea
20th-century South Korean people
21st-century South Korean people